Gillis Backereel (1572 - before 1662) was a Flemish painter of history subjects.  The artist was principally active in Antwerp where he produced various compositions for the local churches.

Life
Gillis Backereel is believed to have been born in Antwerp in 1572. There is no record of his training.  He is known to have travelled to Italy where he resided in Rome. The dates are not known with certainty and estimates vary from prior to 1630, to the period between 1639 and 1643.

He became a master in the Antwerp Guild of St Luke in 1630.  He lived a relatively quiet and secluded life.  In 1651 he suddenly employed four apprentices including Dominicus de Beselaer the Elder and Frans de Hase. The latter was hired without pay in return for his training. A certain Francis de Crayer was also his pupil.

Gillis had reportedly a much older brother called Willem Backereel who enjoyed a good reputation as a landscape painter and left young for Rome where he died young. The early Dutch biographer Arnold Houbraken reported that the Backereel family produced a number of artists and that Joachim von Sandrart mentioned seven or eight Backereel family members that he knew personally. Today Gillis is one of only three Backereel family members documented. The other two are Gillis' brother Willem Backereel and Jacques Backereel.

The date of Gillis' death is not recorded but is believed to have occurred between 1654 and 1662.

Work
Not many of Backereel's works have been preserved.  They all depict religious and mythological subject matter.

His Adoration of the Shepherds and Vision of St. Felix are in the Royal Museums of Fine Arts of Belgium in Brussels and his Hero mourns the dead Leander in the Kunsthistorisches Museum in Vienna.

Backereel provided the design for an engraving by Wenceslaus Hollar representing Bruno of Cologne published in 1649.

References

External links

Flemish Baroque painters
Flemish history painters
1572 births
Year of death unknown
Artists from Antwerp